Philip De Witt Ginder (September 19, 1905 – November 7, 1968) was a career soldier in the United States Army. A highly decorated combat veteran, he rose to the rank of major general during the Korean War, while commanding 45th Infantry Division. He was a recipient of the Distinguished Service Cross, the United States' second-highest military award.

Early life

Ginder was born on September 19, 1905 in Plainfield, New Jersey, the son of Grant D. and Emma Edith (Troxell) Ginder. He was raised in Scranton, Pennsylvania, and graduated from Scranton Central High School in 1923. In high school, Ginder was the senior class president, manager of the football team, and president of the school's athletic association.

Ginder passed a competitive examination for a Congressional appointment to the United States Military Academy offered by Representative Laurence Hawley Watres. He began attendance at West Point in 1923, graduated in 1927, and was ranked 171st of 293. At graduation, he received his commission as a second lieutenant of Infantry.

Start of career
Ginder completed the infantry officer qualification course in 1933, and his early career included postings to: Fort Wadsworth, New York; Manila, Philippine Islands; Fort Benning, Georgia; Fort Missoula, Montana; and Schofield Barracks, Hawaii.

World War II

During World War II, Ginder was the assistant chief of staff for personnel (G-1) for the Fourth United States Army. Appointed to command the 357th Infantry Regiment, a unit of the 90th Infantry Division, he was among the first ashore during the Normandy Landings on D-Day, June 6, 1944. Ginder developed a reputation for subpar performance in combat, with observers and subordinates calling him "obtuse" and "full of boast and posturing." 357th veteran William E. DePuy called Ginder "as close to being incompetent as it is possible to be." Ginder was ultimately relieved of command during combat and escorted to the division command post under armed guard.

Ginder was later appointed commander of the 121st Infantry Regiment, an 8th Infantry Division unit. He was in command of the regiment when it captured the German town of Hürtgen as part of the Battle of Hürtgen Forest. It was for this action that he received the Distinguished Service Cross for actions on November 28, 1944, when he personally led his reserve company through the town in bitter house-to-house fighting while armed only with his pistol and a hand grenade.

Ginder was appointed the commanding officer of the 9th Infantry Regiment in the spring of the 1945. Ginder commanded the regiment until the end of the war, taking part in liberating the western part of Czechoslovakia, and ending the war in the town of Rokycany near Pilsen.

From 1946 to 1949, Ginder attended the National War College and served in the Far East on the staff of General Douglas MacArthur. From 1949 to 1951, he served as senior military attaché in Prague, Czechoslovakia.

Korean War and senior commands
Ginder commanded the 6th Infantry Regiment, Berlin (1951–1952), the 45th Infantry Division, Korea (1953), the 37th Infantry Division, Fort Riley (1954), 10th Mountain Division (1954–1955) and Fifth United States Army (1955). He went to Korea as a colonel, and advanced to major general in less than two years, making him the youngest American general to command a combat division in Korea. His service in Korea included nearly 18 months spent north of the 38th parallel.

After the Korean War, Ginder commanded Fort Polk, Fort Riley, Camp McCoy, the Fifth United States Army, and served in the office of the Chief of Staff of the United States Army as special assistant for Reserve and National Guard Forces. His final posting was to Governor's Island as deputy commander of First United States Army. He retired a major general in 1959.

Post-military career
After his retirement from the army, Ginder was president of the Brazilian-American Export Company, and joined the boards of directors of several other companies.

Ginder died at New York City's Trafalgar Hospital on November 7, 1968, after suffering a cerebral hemorrhage. He was buried at West Point Cemetery, Section V, Row A, Site 41.

Family
Ginder's first wife was Martha Calvert, whom he married in 1933, and with whom he had two daughters, Jean and Louise. They divorced in 1945.  Ginder was next married to Jean Dalrymple, the head of the City Center Drama and Light Opera Companies, whom he met in 1951 while she was organizing United States participation at the Berlin Arts Festival on behalf of the United States Department of State.

Decorations
Here is the ribbon bar of Major General Philip De Witt Ginder:

References

Sources

Internet

Books

External links
Papers of Phillip De Witt Ginder at Dwight D. Eisenhower Presidential Library

1905 births
1968 deaths
People from Plainfield, New Jersey
American people of Dutch descent
People from Scranton, Pennsylvania
United States Military Academy alumni
Military personnel from Pennsylvania
United States Army personnel of World War II
Recipients of the Silver Star
Recipients of the Distinguished Service Cross (United States)
Recipients of the Legion of Merit
Officiers of the Légion d'honneur
Recipients of the Croix de Guerre 1939–1945 (France)
Recipients of the Military Order of the White Lion
Recipients of the Czechoslovak War Cross
National War College alumni
United States military attachés
United States Army personnel of the Korean War
United States Army generals
Recipients of the Distinguished Service Medal (US Army)
Recipients of the Order of Military Merit (Korea)
People from Danbury, Connecticut
Burials at West Point Cemetery